Stine Ruscetta Skogrand (born 3 March 1993) is a Norwegian handball player for Ikast Håndbold and the Norwegian national team.

Her position is mainly right back, although in the national team she usually plays right wing.

She made her debut on the Norwegian national team in 2013.

Achievements
Olympic Games:
Bronze: 2020
World Championship:
Winner: 2015
Silver Medalist: 2017
European Championship
Winner: 2016, 2020, 2022
World Youth Championship:
Silver Medalist: 2010
Norwegian Cup:
Finalist: 2013
Danish Cup:
Winner: 2019

Individual awards
 All-Star Right Back of Damehåndboldligaen: 2017/2018, 2020/2021

Personal life
Is in a relationship with fellow handballer, Eivind Tangen. In October 2018 she announced her first pregnancy and in November 2021 she announched her second pregnancy.

References

External links
 
 
 Stine Skogrand at the Norwegian Handball Federation 
 
 

1993 births
Living people
Sportspeople from Bergen
Norwegian female handball players
Norwegian expatriate sportspeople in Denmark
Expatriate handball players
Handball players at the 2020 Summer Olympics
Olympic bronze medalists for Norway
Medalists at the 2020 Summer Olympics
Olympic medalists in handball
Olympic handball players of Norway